Emmanuel Smith may refer to:

Emmanuel Smith (born 1995), American football linebacker
Emmanuel Smith (singer) on The Voice UK (series 8)
Emmanuel Smith (footballer) for Watanga FC
Emmanuel Smith (athlete) in 1987 Central American and Caribbean Championships in Athletics

See also
Emmanuele Smith, English footballer